is a passenger railway station  located in the city of  Nishinomiya Hyōgo Prefecture, Japan. It is operated by the private transportation company Hankyu Railway. It is located near Mondo-Yakujin (Tōkōji), a famous tailsman temple and the station name is after the temple. In addition, Kobe College and Seiwa College are near the station.

Lines

Layout
The station consists of two opposed ground-level side platforms, connected by an underground passage.

Platforms

Adjacent stations

History
The station opened on September 2, 1921 when the line between Nishinomiya-Kitaguchi and Takarazuka (then called the Saihō Line) started operation.

Passenger statistics
In fiscal 2019, the station was used by an average of 20,452 passengers daily

Surrounding area
Nishinomiya Municipal Central Hospital
Mondo-Yakujin Tōkō-ji
Kobe College
Seiwa College
Nishinomiya Municipal Koto Elementary School

See also
List of railway stations in Japan

References

External links

 Mondo-Yakujin Station (Hankyu Railway) 

Railway stations in Hyōgo Prefecture
Hankyu Railway Imazu Line
Stations of Hankyu Railway
Railway stations in Japan opened in 1921
Nishinomiya